Ante Roguljić (born 11 March 1996) is a Croatian professional footballer who plays as a midfielder for Liga I club CS Universitatea Craiova.

Club career
Having played in the youth teams of Omladinac Vranjic and NK Adriatic Split, Roguljić joined Red Bull Salzburg in July 2013 following Croatia's EU accession.

He was immediately loaned to the club's farm team FC Liefering to gain first-team experience. He made his debut on 2 August 2013 in a 4–1 win against Parndorf, and he scored his first goal in the following game, a 5–1 win against Rheindorf Altach on 6 August. He made a total of 21 appearances in his debut season for FC Liefering in the Erste Liga, scoring three goals and managing two assists, playing mostly as a central or attacking midfielder.

Red Bull Salzburg decided to send Roguljić back on loan to FC Liefering, their feeder team, for the 2014–15 season. Roguljić enjoyed good form for Liefering in the first half of the season and so was called up to Red Bull Salzburg's first team for their cup match against Wacker Innsbruck, where he came on as a substitute and scored the winner in extra time in a 1–2 victory. On 1 November 2014, he made his league debut against Admira Wacker, playing 46 minutes before being replaced by Konrad Laimer.

He went on a loan to Hajduk Split in the summer of 2015 where he was wanted by coach Damir Burić. In the beginning, he was regularly picked in the first team and played an important role during Hajduk's European qualification campaign in the summer. Later, he started to underperform and was put on the bench where he mostly spent the rest of the season. In May 2016, his loan with Hajduk ended.

International career
Roguljić has represented Croatia at various youth levels. He also represented his country at both the 2013 UEFA European Under-17 Championship and the 2013 FIFA U-17 World Cup.

References

External links
 

1996 births
Living people
Footballers from Split, Croatia
Association football midfielders
Croatian footballers
Croatia youth international footballers
Croatia under-21 international footballers
FC Red Bull Salzburg players
FC Liefering players
HNK Hajduk Split players
FC Admira Wacker Mödling players
FC Wacker Innsbruck (2002) players
Pafos FC players
AS Trenčín players
CS Universitatea Craiova players
Austrian Football Bundesliga players
2. Liga (Austria) players
Croatian Football League players
Cypriot First Division players
Slovak Super Liga players
Liga I players
Croatian expatriate footballers
Croatian expatriate sportspeople in Austria
Croatian expatriate sportspeople in Cyprus
Croatian expatriate sportspeople in Slovakia
Croatian expatriate sportspeople in Romania
Expatriate footballers in Austria
Expatriate footballers in Cyprus
Expatriate footballers in Slovakia
Expatriate footballers in Romania